Emmay Entertainment and Motion Pictures LLP is an Indian content production company based in Mumbai, India. It was founded by Nikkhil Advani, Monisha Advani and Madhu Bhojwani in 2011. After its inception, it began with full-length feature films and gradually expanded to television, short films, telefilms and digital content.

History 
Emmay Entertainment was founded by Indian film director Nikkhil Advani, his sister Monisha Advani, and friend, Madhu Bhojwani. Nikkhil Advani has worked on films like Kuch Kuch Hota Hai, Kabhi Khushi Kabhi Gham and Mohabbatein. The first film he directed was Kal Ho Na Ho, which won six Filmfare awards. After starting Emmay, he has been involved with multiple projects like D-Day, Hero, Katti Batti, Airlift.

Films
The first feature film produced by Emmay Entertainment was D-Day, which was received with positive reviews along with a few awards. Another film produced by Emmay was Airlift, which was their first to cross 1 billion on the box office and also their first to receive a National Award. Apart from these two films, Emmay also produced Katti Batti and Hero; with the latter bagging a Filmfare award. Emmay Entertainment also produced the prison film Lucknow Central directed by Ranjit Tiwari It stars Farhan Akhtar as the lead actor.

Their next film was Satyameva Jayate, a vigilante action film Directed by Milap Zaveri starring John Abraham, Manoj Bajpayee, Amruta Khanvilkar and Debutante Aisha Sharma that was released on 15 August 2018. Followed by Baazaar an Indian crime thriller movie directed by Gauravv K. Chawla, and written by Nikkhil Advani, Aseem Arora and Parveez Sheikh. Starring Saif Ali Khan, debutant Rohan Vinod Mehra, Radhika Apte and Chitrangada Singh. Nikkhil Advani announced the film Batla House a 2019 action thriller film written by Ritesh Shah starring John Abraham opposite Mrunal Thakur. Inspired by the Batla House encounter case that took place in 2008, the story showcases the encounter and its aftermath. The film was released on 15 August 2019 and became commercially successful at the box office.

In 2019, the company produced Marjaavaan a romantic action film directed by Milap Zaveri and starring Sidharth Malhotra, Riteish Deshmukh, Tara Sutaria and Rakul Preet Singh. The film is a co-production with T-Series and was released on 15 November 2019 and became commercially successful at the box office.

In 2020, Emmay produced Indoo Ki Jawani, directed by Abir Sengupta starring Kiara Advani, Aditya seal and Mallika Dua. It is a coming of age comedy film that revolves around a girl from Ghaziabad and her misadventures with dating apps. The film was released on 11 December 2020. 

Sardar Ka Grandson (lit. 'Sardar's Grandson') is a 2021 Indian Hindi-language comedy-drama film directed by Kaashvie Nair and written by Anuja Chauhan and Kaashvi Nair. The film was produced under the banner Emmay Entertainment, T-Series and JA Entertainment. The film features Arjun Kapoor, Neena Gupta and Rakul Preet Singh in lead roles. It's a love story spanning three-generation, starting in 1946 and continuing till 2020. While John Abraham and Aditi Rao Hydari played cameo roles as Arjun Kapoor's grandparents in 1946 track.

The film was released on 18 May 2021 on Netflix.

Upcoming projects 
Their next upcoming film, Mrs.Chatterjee vs Norway, in association with Zee Studios is currently on floors. Starring Rani Mukerji in the lead, the movie is the directorial of Ashima Chibber. The film is an untold story about a journey of a mother's battle against an entire country. Inspired by the 2011 true story of an Indian couple whose children were taken away from them by Norwegian welfare services.

Television
A television film called Shaadi Vaadi And All That, an hour-long film for MTV, produced by Nikkhil Advani is a love triangle with a twist. The show is Kaashvi Nair's directorial debut who worked with Nikkhil as an assistant director.

Nikkhil Advani has directed a finite TV Series P.O.W.- Bandi Yuddh Ke for Star Plus. The show is an official adaption of an Israeli TV series Hatufim. The series was premiered on 7 November 2016.

Web series
Hasmukh (2020)

Directed by Nikhil Gonsalves and written by Suparn Verma, Vir Das, Nikkhil Advani, Amogh Ranadive and Neeraj Pandey was released on Netflix on 17 April. Headlined by Vir Das as ‘Hasmukh’ and Ranvir Shorey as ‘Jimmy’ the show's crew also consists of Amrita Bagchi, Mantra, Ravi Kishan, Manoj Pahwa, Joanna Robaczewska, Raza Murad, among others. Emmay Entertainment as the production house, have created this show in association with Applause Entertainment.

Mumbai Diaries 26/11 (2021)

A series for Amazon, Mumbai Diaries 26/11 is based on 2008 Mumbai terrorist attacks. The series is directed by Nikkhil Advani and Nikhil Gonsalves and stars Mohit Raina, Tina Desai, Shreya Dhanwantary alongside Konkona Sen Sharma.

The Empire (2021)

The Empire is an Indian historical fiction streaming television series created by Nikkhil Advani based on Empire of the Moghul by Alex Rutherford for Disney+ Hotstar. Directed by Mitakshara Kumar, it stars Shabana Azmi, Kunal Kapoor, Dino Morea and Drashti Dhami.

Kaun Banegi Shikharwati (2022)

A Zee5 series, Kaun Banegi Shikharwati is directed by Gauravv Chawla and Ananya Banerjee. It revolves around the life of a former king, who has a dysfunctional family, devises an outlandish plan to unite his estranged daughters. Meanwhile, an income tax investigation looms over the palace's hidden treasure.

Rocket Boys (2022)

Rocket Boys is an Indian Hindi-language Biographical streaming television series on SonyLIV. The series is based on the lives of Homi J. Bhabha and Vikram Sarabhai. Directed by Abhay Pannu and produced under the banner of Emmay Entertainment and Roy Kapur Films respectively. The series stars Jim Sarbh and Ishwak Singh along with Regina Cassandra.  The series was released on 4 February 2022.

Short films
Guddu Engineer (2016)

Emmay produced the short film, Guddu Engineer for the Zeal for Unity in 2016 and was directed by Nikkhil Advani.

Unpaused – Apartment (2020)

Amazon Prime Video unveiled Unpaused, an anthology of five Hindi short films filmed during the pandemic and featuring stories about new beginnings. Amongst which one such short film is Apartment directed by Nikkhil Advani, starring Richa Chadha, Sumeet Vyas, and Ishwak Singh. The plot focuses on the fall and ultimate rise of Chadha's character as she comes to terms with her husband's indiscretions with the help of a friendly neighbor.

Films

Television shows

References

External links 
 Official website
 Emmay Entertainment on Internet Movie Database

Indian companies established in 2011
Film production companies based in Mumbai
2011 establishments in Maharashtra
Mass media companies established in 2011